The Mulberry Bush School is an independent residential special school in the village of Standlake in Oxfordshire, for children aged 5 to 12 years.

The school was founded in 1948 by self-taught psychologist Barbara Dockar Drysdale with the backing of the Ministry of Education and the Home Office. She and her husband were co-principals until 1962.

The school is a registered charity.

The Mulberry Bush School is the subject of a BBC documentary film, Hold Me Tight, Let Me Go, directed by Kim Longinotto.

See also
List of schools in the South East of England

References

External links
ISBI: Mulberry Bush School, Oxfordshire
Ofsted: Mulberry Bush School

Educational institutions established in 1948
Boarding schools in Oxfordshire
Private schools in Oxfordshire
Special schools in Oxfordshire
Charities based in Oxfordshire
1948 establishments in England